The Charlotte Checkers were an American ice hockey team in Charlotte, North Carolina, and played in the ECHL (formerly the East Coast Hockey League).

Franchise history
Following a 17-year break from ice hockey, the Checkers returned in 1993 and made the playoffs ten times, including winning the ECHL Championship in 1996.

The Checkers franchise was founded in 1993, and was owned by a consortium headed by local auto dealer and NASCAR team owner Felix Sabates, with former Charlotte Hornets president Carl Scheer and NASCAR drivers Richard and Kyle Petty among the minority partners. They played in the old Charlotte Coliseum, which was heavily renovated and renamed Independence Arena.  

Soon after winning the Jack Riley Cup in 1996, Sabates sold controlling interest minority partner Tim Braswell, who claimed he could make the team more popular. However, in a case of exceptionally bad timing, this came just as the NFL's Carolina Panthers were due to open their new downtown stadium. The team's popularity faded, forcing Braswell to sell the Checkers to Hornets owners George Shinn and Ray Wooldrige in 2000 for $3 million. However, Shinn and Wooldridge were unable to revive the team at the gate, forcing them to sell the team back to Sabates and Scheer for $500,000. By comparison, Sabates had sold the team in 1996 for $5 million.

The Checkers played at the old coliseum, which was later renamed Cricket Arena, until 2005 when they moved to Time Warner Cable Arena in downtown Charlotte. The team set their all-time attendance record of 12,398 on February 21, 2009 in a 5-2 win against the Florida Everblades. Their previous record was 11,237 in a loss against the Texas Wildcatters in February 2007.

On January 21, 2010, it was reported that Michael Kahn, who had bought the team from Sabates and Scheer in 2006, was in talks to buy the Albany River Rats, the American Hockey League affiliate of the NHL's Carolina Hurricanes. On February 10, the sale of the River Rats to Kahn was confirmed. Kahn then moved the Rats to Charlotte and changed their name to the Checkers starting with the 2010–11 season.  As a result of this, Kahn returned the Checkers ECHL franchise to the ECHL at the end of the 2009–10 ECHL season, ending the franchise's ECHL history.

Season-by-season record
Records as of 2009–10 season.

Notes: There were no conferences in the ECHL prior to the 1997–98 season. Games tied at end of regulation went directly to shootout from 1995–2000

Playoffs
1993–94: Lost to Greensboro 2-1 in first round.
1994–95: Lost to Greensboro 3-0 in first round.
1995–96: Defeated Roanoke 3-0 in first round; defeated South Carolina 3-2 in quarterfinals; defeated Tallahassee 3-1 in semifinals; defeated Jacksonville 4-0 to win championship.
1996–97: Lost to South Carolina 3-0 in first round.
1997–98: Defeated Birmingham 3-1 in first round; lost to Pensacola 3-0 in quarterfinals.
1998–99: Did not qualify.
1999–00: Did not qualify.
2000–01: Lost to Dayton 3-2 in first round.
2001–02: Lost to Atlantic City 3-2 in first round.
2002–03: Did not qualify.
2003–04: Did not qualify.
2004–05: Defeated Columbia 3-2 in first round; defeated Gwinnett 3-1 in quarterfinals; lost to Florida 4-2 in semifinals.
2005–06: Lost to South Carolina 2-1 in first round.
2006–07: Lost to Florida 3-0 in first round.
2007–08: Lost to Gwinnett 3-0 in first round.
2008–09: Lost to South Carolina 4-2 in first round.
2009–10: Defeated Toledo 3-1 in first round; lost to Cincinnati 4-2 in quarterfinals.

Team records

Single season
Goals: 48  Sergei Berdnikov (1993–94)
Assists: 61  Matt Robbins (1994–95),  Scott King (2000–01),  Kevin Hilton (2000–01)
Points: 101  Scott King (2000–01)
Penalty Minutes: 352  Eric Boulton (1996–97)
GAA: 2.43  Scott Meyer (2003–04)
SV%: .923  Scott Meyer (2003–04),  Jeff Jakaitis (2008–09),
Wins: 32  Nick Vitucci (1995–96)
Shutouts: 3  Scott Meyer (2003–04),  Alex Westlund (2006–07)

Goaltending records need a minimum 25 games played by the goaltender

| text_color  = white
| bg_color    = #6495ED
| team        = Charlotte Checkers

Career
Career Goals: 174 Darryl Noren
Career Assists: 229  Darryl Noren
Career Points: 403  Darryl Noren
Career Penalty Minutes: 213 Steve MacIntyre

Notable players
Scott Bailey
Eric Boulton
Eric Cairns
Daniel Girardi
Chris Holt
Dusty Jamieson
Antti Laaksonen
Jason LaBarbera
Steve MacIntyre
Darryl Noren
David Oliver
Matt Robbins
Paxton Schafer
Rob Tallas
Shawn Wheeler
Derek Wilkinson
Peter Worrell
Joe Zappala

Retired numbers
4 – Kurt Seher

References

External links
 Charlotte Checkers Official Website

1993 establishments in North Carolina
2010 disestablishments in North Carolina
Charlotte Checkers
Defunct ECHL teams
Ice hockey clubs established in 1993
Ice hockey teams in North Carolina
Sports clubs disestablished in 2010
Boston Bruins minor league affiliates
Colorado Avalanche minor league affiliates
Ottawa Senators minor league affiliates